Azeus Convene, also known as “Convene”, is a software developed by Azeus Systems. It is a software for board of directors. Azeus Systems is an information technology investment holding company founded by Lee Wan Lik in 1991.

History 
Launched in 2010 Convene is written in Java, Objective-C and SQL programming languages. From 2011 to 2015 early beta versions of the software was still under development. Its first name was Anywhere Pad but by 2015 it rebrands as Azeus Convene.

Convene expands its availability to different regions and countries on February, 2020. Convene in Teams has been launched on 2021, Azeus Systems in collaboration with Microsoft, announces the launch, Convene in teams integrate Microsoft Teams in its software functionality. In November, 2021 The Manila Bulletin published an article about Convene launching AGM@Convene, currently called as ConveneAGM.

In 2022 Klenty published an article about how Azeus Convene used multi-channel outreach to expand their business. On February, 2022 The Manila Times published an article about Azeus Systems regarding the company's wanting to fortifies the presence of Convene due to the Pandemic that has shifted the way meetings are conducted from physical boardrooms to virtual platforms.

Azeus Convene enters the Malaysian market in April, 2022 for its software iteration of Virtual AGM and partnered with KPMG International Limited to introduce the said iteration of the software to all Malaysian listed companies. Convene expands operation to strengthens its local presence across Gulf Cooperation Council regions in October, 2022.

Security 
Lists of security functions of the software:

 Application security
 User accounts and system security preferences
 Document security and digital rights management (DRM)
 Device security
 Secure user authentication
 Cloud infrastructure and network security
 Security governance

Divisions 
The software functionality is divided to the following divisions:

 AGM - Annual General Meeting
 Uni - University
 ESG - Environmental Social and Governance
 Records - Document Management
 Teams - Meeting Management

References

External links 
 Official Website
 UK Website

Application software
Collaborative software